Jenny Simpson is the only album by American country music singer Jenny Simpson. It was released on November 3, 1998 via Mercury Nashville.

Content
It includes the single "Ticket Out of Kansas", Simpson's only chart entry, which was previously recorded by Regina Regina on their debut album. Also included is "Grow Young with You", a duet with Michael Peterson. This song was later recorded by Andy Griggs and Coley McCabe for the soundtrack to the 2000 film Where the Heart Is.

Critical reception
Jana Pendragon of Allmusic gave the album two stars out of five, writing that Simpson "sounds like a million other young women trying to break into pop-country music." Jeffrey B. Remz of Country Standard Time said that Simpson's voice was "pleasant enough", but thought that the album's sound lacked variety.

Track listing
"Ticket Out of Kansas" (Tia Sillers) — 3:27
"Even When You're Not There (Get a Life)" (Ray Methvin, Pound Lamb) — 3:34
"A Million Miles Away" (Jess Leary, Verlon Thompson) — 3:04
"Little Miracles" (Troy Verges, Mark D. Sanders) — 2:57
"You" (Michael Lunn, Jeff Pennig) — 4:58
"Foolish as That May Be" (Kieran Kane) — 4:33
"Under the Rainbow" (Methvin, James Nihan) — 3:20
"Grow Young with You" (Austin Cunningham, Hillary Lindsey) — 3:53
duet with Michael Peterson
"One Word" (Don Schlitz, Angela Kaset) — 3:53
"So I Kissed Him" (Methvin, Jenny Simpson) — 2:54
"Til Then" (Methvin, Simpson) — 3:29

Personnel
Compiled from liner notes.
Eddie Bayers — drums (tracks 1-3)
J. T. Corenflos — electric guitar (track 10)
Dan Dugmore — lap steel guitar (tracks 8, 10), pedal steel guitar (tracks 6, 11)
Stuart Duncan — fiddle (tracks 3), mandolin (tracks 7, 8)
Thom Flora — background vocals (tracks 2, 4, 6, 11)
 Larry Franklin — fiddle (tracks 4, 6)
Paul Franklin — lap steel guitar (track 1), pedal steel guitar (tracks 2-4, 7, 9)
 Garth Fundis — background vocals (track 1)
John Gardner — drums (track 11)
Lisa Gregg — background vocals (track 3)
Aubrey Haynie — fiddle (tracks 9, 11)
Brent Mason — electric guitar (tracks 1-9)
Ray Methvin — acoustic guitar (track 10), background vocals (track 3)
Greg Morrow — drums (tracks 4-10), percussion (track 5, 8, 10)
Steve Nathan — electric piano (track 1), piano (tracks 2, 3), organ (tracks 2, 5), keyboards (track 3)
Dave Pomeroy — bass guitar
Tom Roady — tambourine (tracks 1, 2), chimes (track 3)
Matt Rollings — electric piano (track 10), piano (tracks 4, 6-9, 11), organ (track 6)
Sunny Russ — background vocals (tracks 1, 2, 4, 6, 10)
Darrell Scott — acoustic guitar (tracks 1-9), mandolin (track 1)
Jenny Simpson — lead vocals, background vocals (tracks 2, 5)
Biff Watson — acoustic guitar (tracks 1, 10, 11)
Andrea Zonn — background vocals (track 3)

String arrangements on tracks 5 and 7 by Kris Wilkinson.

References

Jenny Simpson albums
1998 debut albums
Mercury Nashville albums
Albums produced by Garth Fundis